Mordellaria aurata is a species of beetle in the genus Mordellaria of the family Mordellidae. It was described in 1928.

References

Beetles described in 1928
Mordellidae
Taxa named by Hiromichi Kono